The Ohio State Buckeyes women's ice hockey program represent the Ohio State University during the 2020-21 NCAA Division I women's ice hockey season. The program qualified for the 2021 NCAA National Collegiate Women's Ice Hockey Tournament, ranked as the #3 seed.

Offseason

Recruiting

Regular season

Standings

Schedule
Source:

|-
!colspan=12 style="  "| Regular Season
|-

Roster

2020–21 Buckeyes

Awards and honors
Andrea Braendli, Finalist for the Hockey Commissioners Association’s Women’s Hockey Goalie of the Year Award
Emma Maltais, All-USCHO.com Third Team

References

Ohio State Buckeyes
Ohio State
Ohio State
Ohio State
NCAA women's ice hockey Frozen Four seasons
Ohio State Buckeyes women's ice hockey seasons